Altos is a city and district of the Cordillera Department, Paraguay.

Etymology

It is also called “Altos de Ybypytaré”, which in Guaraní means “path of the wind”, previously called “San Lorenzo de la Cordillera de los Altos”, one of the oldest cities of Paraguay. It is known as the “Terrace of the country” because of its high altitude.

Climate

The climate in this department is mild and dry. The average temperature is 22° Celsius, in summer reaches 39 °C and in winter drops to 3 °C.

Demography

Altos’ population is 13,114 in total, 6,862 men and 6,252 women, according to information provided by the Statistics, Polls and Census General Direction.

History

There are two versions of its foundation. The first tells that Domingo Martínez de Irala founded it, on August 10, 1538. The second one tells that it was Friar Luis de Bolaños in 1580, with the distinction of being the first of many reducciónes (Roman Catholic missions) of the Guaraní people in Paraguay.

It was the hiding place of Joseph Mengele, notorious nazi scientist and medical doctor, who experimented in the Nazi concentration camps. Mengele and his wife flew to Altos in 1959, after the government of West Germany discovered their home in Buenos Aires, Argentina, and he received the notification for arrest. His wife did not adapt to this new life and left him. In 1960, he panicked after hearing news of the interest of the nazi hunter in his capture, and with kidnapping of Adolf Eichmann, left Altos to go to Hohenau in the South of Paraguay.

Economy

The Altos is known for the harvesting of pharmacological plants and coffee, as well as general agriculture, woodcraft, and the breeding of horned cattle.

Tourism

The church is from the time of the Jesuit Missions and in honor of its patron saint, San Lorenzo (Saint Lawrence).

It is located in Heroes' Square in the center of the city.

Marshal José Félix Estigarribia's fatal plane crash was near the city of Altos, by the Aguaí Stream.

The most important artisan production is the carving of timbó wood in the shape of animals, mythological beings and masks that are later painted with intense colors. The masks became famous as “kamba ra’anga”, an image of the mulatto, used in the re-enactments of the battles between the kambá (mulattos) and the guaicurúes (natives), during the festivities of Saint Peter and Saint Paul, on July 28 and 29th in Itaguazú, located 2 kilometers from Altos. This is an important festivity of colonial origins in which are also organized games and prepared typical food.

The route to access the city provides a beautiful landscape for visitors to enjoy, because it goes up a chain of mountains and looks down onto the Ypacaraí Lake and the exuberant vegetation surrounding it. “The Tukanga Route” is an outing offered by the Municipality and it is called that way because of the abundance of “tucanes” (toucans) in the area. The region is distinctive for its richness in natural resources.

There is also the Saldivar Stream, located in a natural reserve with more than 4 hectares, 8 kilometers from the center of city.

The farm “El Gaucho” has 4 hectares of abundant vegetation, with modern and comfortable amenities that recreate colonial times.

The rural hotel “La Grappa” offers visitors the natural environment of the mountainous country, in addition to nights of Paraguayan and Latin American folklore.

People from Altos

Altos is the hometown of the internationally renowned artist Luis Alberto del Paraná. His house is located in the historical area of the city. Luis Alberto traveled through all Europe, entertaining with his music and receiving important awards for his records.

How to get to Altos

Altos is situated on the asphalt road turning off from Ruta 2 near Ypacaraí, passing San Bernardino, Altos, Loma Grande, Nueva Colombia and leading in Ruta 3 in Emboscada. There is also an asphalt road connecting Altos with Atyrá.

The new ECO Vía highway connects Luque with San Bernardino. If you can find your way, this is now the fastest connection from Asunción to Altos, especially if you are arriving from the airport area.

A bus line connects Altos to Gran Asunción. LOMA GRANDE (yellow buses) circle line starts in Loma Grande, serves Altos, San Bernardino, and Ypacaraí, then follows Ruta 2 to San Lorenzo, continues to Fernando de la Mora (calle Mcal. Estigarribia), heads north in Calle Última of Asunción, passes Mariano Roque Alonso, Limpio, follows Ruta 3 to Emboscada, turns off to the Loma Grande starting point, turns round and covers the whole way in the opposite direction. The former ALTOS bus line (green buses) was discontinued. To get to Altos from central Asunción, take one of the plenty buses passing calle Mcal. (Mariscal) Estigarribia of Fernando de la Mora where you may change to the LOMA GRANDE bus line towards San Lorenzo.

References

 Illustrated Geography of Paraguay, 2007. Arami S. R. L. Distributor.
 Geography of Paraguay, First Edition 1999, Editorial HIspana Paraguay S. R. L.

External links
Secretaria Nacional de Turismo

Populated places in the Cordillera Department